Haven is a hamlet south of Wurtsboro, New York, on route 209 and Haven Road which crosses the Basha Kill to the South Rd. The area is known by the old Moose Lodge which now appears to be closed. The Brownsville cemetery is at the end of Tow Path Road, a cemetery from the 1830s situated in the woods above the Basha Kill.  The hamlet also has Giovanni's Inn, which is an Italian restaurant.

Hamlets in New York (state)
Hamlets in Sullivan County, New York